Silesian cuisine belongs to the region of Silesia in Central Europe. It is a subtype of Polish and German cuisine with many similarities to and signs of the influence of neighbouring cuisines. The cuisine is particularly renowned for its poppy seed and knödel dishes.

List of Silesian dishes
 Żymła - a well-baked bread roll, oval with a division in the middle, topped with poppy seeds, similar to Austrian Kaisersemmel.
 Kluski śląskie/Schlesische Kartoffelklöße (Silesian dumplings) - round dumplings served with gravy, made of mashed boiled potatoes, finely grated raw potatoes, an egg, grated onion, wheat flour, and potato flour
 Schlesisches Himmelreich ("Silesian Heaven") - a dish of smoked pork cooked in water with dried fruit and spices
 Rolada z modrą kapustą (rouladen with red cabbage) - best-quality beef-meat roll; stuffed with pickled vegetable, ham, and good amount of seasoning; always served with red cabbage (with fried bacon, fresh onion and allspice); traditionally eaten with kluski śląskie for Sunday dinner
 Szałot - a salad made of cubes of boiled potatoes and carrots, peas, ham, various sausages, pickled fish, boiled eggs, seasoned with olive oil or mayonnaise
 Kaszanka/Krupniok/Grützwurst - a type of blood sausage made of kasha and animal blood
 Żymlok - like krupniok but instead of kasha, bread roll (żymła) is used
 Wodzionka/Brotsuppe - soup with garlic and cubes of dried rye bread
 Siemieniotka/Hanfsuppe - soup made of hemp seed, a main Christmas Eve meal
 Knysza - pita bread filled with meat and cabbage
 Moczka/Motschka/Lebkuchensauce/Polnische Sauce - a traditional Christmas Eve dessert, its main ingredients are gingerbread extract, nuts and dried fruit, strawberry compote, and almonds.
 Makówki/Mohnpielen - traditional Christmas Eve dessert, based on finely ground poppy seeds, with raisins, almonds, candied citrus peels, honey, sugar, and pudding, and flavoured with rum
 Hauskyjza - strongly flavored, home-made cheese with caraway seeds
 Kopalnioki - hard candies made of sugar, anise oil, and the essences of St John's wort, melissa, and peppermint, its black colour comes from charcoal food dye.
 Streuselkuchen/Kołocz śląski - made of a yeast dough covered with a sweet crumb
  Liegnitzer Bombe'' - small chocolate-covered gingerbread cakes filled with marzipan and fruit or nuts, historically a speciality of Legnica (Liegnitz)

References

 
 
Silesia